Shenstone is a village and civil parish in The Lichfield District, Staffordshire, England, located between Lichfield and Sutton Coldfield. The parish also contains the village of Stonnall.

Transport

There are also services to Redditch and Bromsgrove as well as Birmingham New Street. The village also is the only settlement in Lichfield District to have an active railway station after the two stations in Lichfield.

The village is also situated next to the M6 Toll which offers road connections to Stafford, Wolverhampton, South Staffordshire, Brownhills, Cannock, Tamworth and Coleshill. It also offers connections to the M6 Motorway and M42 Motorway. The village is also near Watling Street which connects from Holyhead in Wales to London. The village is also near the main Chester Road between Brownhills and Leamington Spa.

Education
The village is served by Greysbrooke Primary School on Barnes Road. A previous incarnation of the school was located on Birmingham Road, on the land currently occupied by the Greysbrooke cul-de-sac.

Interests

Shenstone was formerly the manufacturing home of the Norton Motorcycle. David Garside, a mechanical engineer who had developed a twin-rotor Wankel motorcycle for BSA, joined NVT to help establish production of the Norton Rotary bikes. The old factory still remains on the outskirts of the village, however has been taken over by Elbit Systems and is the site of regular protests.

The village is served by 4 public houses:  The Fox & Hounds, The Railway, The Plough and The Bull's Head.

Demography
The village had an estimated population of 2,234. The ethnic make-up of the village was 97% White, 2% Asian, and 1% Other ethnic. The religious makeup of the village was 77% Christian, 22% No Religion, 1% Muslim and 2% other religion.

Notable people
Actress Helen Baxendale grew up in the village.

Henry Sanders, curate of Shenstone from 1755 to 1770, was author of The History and Antiquities of Shenstone, described as "a model parish history, containing elaborate accounts of the local manors, hamlets, farms, genealogies, and assessments".

History
Shenstone is mentioned in the Domesday Book and its population described as quite large.

See also
Listed buildings in Shenstone, Staffordshire

References

External links

Parish Council website
St. John's Church, Shenstone
The Staffordshire Archaeological and Historical Society: A Landscape Survey of the Parish of Shenstone
GENUKI: Shenstone (Quotes from historical documents)

Civil parishes in Staffordshire
Lichfield District
Villages in Staffordshire